opened in the former grounds of Yonezawa Castle in Yonezawa, Yamagata Prefecture, Japan, in 2001.

See also
 Yamagata Prefectural Museum
 List of National Treasures of Japan (paintings)
 List of National Treasures of Japan (ancient documents)
 List of Important Tangible Folk Cultural Properties

References

External links
  Yonezawa City Uesugi Museum

Museums in Yamagata Prefecture
Yonezawa, Yamagata
Museums established in 2001
2001 establishments in Japan